Miá Mello, artistic name of Marília Penariol Melo (born February 26, 1981), is a Brazilian actress and comedian.

Filmography

Television

Cinema

Musical

Stage

References

External links
 

1981 births
Living people
Actresses from São Paulo
Brazilian television actresses
Brazilian women comedians
Brazilian film actresses
Brazilian stage actresses
Brazilian voice actresses